State highways in Texas are owned and maintained by the U.S. state of Texas, through the Texas Department of Transportation (TxDOT).


List 

|-

See also

References

External links
Texas Department of Transportation
Texas Highway Man

State
State